Helicobia rapax is a species of flesh fly in the family Sarcophagidae.It can be a scavenger or an opportunistic parasitoid of insects or snails.

References

Further reading

External links

 

Sarcophagidae
Insects described in 1849